The theological notes designate a classification of certainty of Catholic beliefs in Catholic theology.

While theological notes qualify positively beliefs and doctrines, said beliefs and doctrines are qualified negatively by theological censures.

The theological notes' "enumeration, division and evaluation" vary between authors.

Authority of the notes 
"[T]he supreme organs for [theological] notes and censures (and exclusively so for infallible matters) are the Pope and the Ecumenical Councils. Limited competences attaches to the Roman Congregations, Provincial Synods (episcopal conferences) and the individual bishops and major superiors of religious orders. The whole people of God is charged with the safeguarding of the true faith. Theologians have a special responsibility and thus are especially qualified to give theological notes [and censures] [...] though their authority is not one of jurisdiction. Their notes [and censures] have the weight of 'professional' opinions and have often influenced the magisterium".

Various classifications

Ludwig Ott

Immediately revealed truths 
Catholic theologian Ludwig Ott considers that immediately revealed truths hold the "highest degree of certainty". "The belief due to them is based on the authority of God Revealing (fides divina), and if the Church, through its teaching, vouches for the fact that a truth is contained in Revelation, one's certainty is then also based on the authority of the Infallible Teaching Authority of the Church (fides catholica). If Truths are defined by a solemn judgment of faith (definition) of the Pope or of a General Council, they are 'de fide definita.

Catholic truths 
Catholic truths refers to Catholic beliefs which are church teachings, definitively decided on by the Magisterium, but not (yet) as being divine revelations properly speaking. Ludwig Ott calls the beliefs of this level Catholic truths, and states states that beliefs of this level "are as infallibly certain as dogmas proper".

Catholic truths are "doctrines and truths defined by the Church not as immediately revealed but as intrinsically connected with the truths of Revelation so that their denial would undermine the revealed truths [...]. These are proposed for belief in virtue of the infallibility of the Church in teaching doctrines of faith or morals (fides ecclesiastica)". They are called "Catholic Truths (veritates catholicae) or Ecclesiastical Teachings (doctrinae ecclesiasticae) to distinguish them from the Divine Truths or Divine Doctrines of Revelation (veritates vel doctrinae divinae)". Ott continues:

Sententia fidei proxima 
A sententia fidei proxima ("teaching proximate to faith") refers to teachings, which are generally accepted as divine revelation by Catholic theologians but not defined as such by the Magisterium.

Teaching pertaining to the faith 
A teaching pertaining to the faith (sententia ad fidem pertinens), or theologically certain (theologice certa), refers to theological conculsions; those are teachings without definitive approval by the Catholic Church, but "[whose] truth is guaranteed by [their] intrinsic connection with the doctrine of revelation".

Sententia communis 
A sententia communis ("common teaching") refers to beliefs which are generally accepted by theologians, but not dogmatically asserted.

Examples of sententia communis beliefs which are cited by Ludwig Ott include:

• The saints in heaven can help the souls in purgatory by intercession

• Dead people cannot receive sacraments

Theological opinions of lesser grades 

Ott states:

Sommaire de théologie dogmatique 
The Sommaire de théologie dogmatique proposes the following theological notes:

 Of Catholic faith (De Fide): when a religious truth "has been revealed by God, is contained in Sacred Scripture or Tradition and has been solemnly defined as such by the Sovereign Pontiff or by an Ecumenical Council defining EX CATHEDRA – that is with the intention of defining – assuming all the required conditions are met. — Or if a truth is presented as such by the ordinary and universal Magisterium of the Church. (Vatican I.)"
 Of divine faith (De Fide divina):  when a religious truth "is for sure contained in Holy Scriptures, but has not been solemnly defined by the Church. E.g.: the birth of Christ in Bethlehem. The same applies to truths revealed privately by God to a person, but for that person only."
 Catholic doctrine, certain (Certum est): "When it is a truth deduced logically from two premises, one of which is formally revealed by God, and the other known by reason alone and not revealed elsewhere, nor contained implicitly in the revealed premise. The truth thus deduced is called THEOLOGICAL CONCLUSION. Many formally but implicitly revealed truths are considered CERTAIN until they are solemnly defined."
 Common (Sententia communis): "It is a truth taught by almost all theologians and opposed by only a few of mediocre authority, but which is nevertheless not disavowed by the Church."
 Probable, more probable (Probabilis): "It is a proposal supported by eminent theologians approved by the ecclesiastical Authority — and which, at the same time, is opposed by other equally eminent theologians. The degree of probability can be based either on the number and authority of theologians who support this proposition (extrinsic probability), or on the value of the arguments provided (intrinsic probability)."

John Hardon 
Catholic theologian John Hardon states:

Edward N. Peters 
Edward N. Peters states that "many of the assertions hitherto listed by theologians with a surfeit of restraint as merely, say, 'sententia communis' might, upon closer investigation in light of the criteria set out in Ad tuendam and its progeny, be found to enjoy infallible certitude, after all, as either primary or, as I think the liceity of the capital punishment qualifies, as secondary objects of infallibility".

See also
Dogma in the Catholic Church
Theological censure
Faith and rationality
Theologoumenon
Dogmatic fact

References

Catholic theology and doctrine
Latin religious words and phrases
Catholic terminology

Further reading